Shakshouka ( : šakšūkah, also spelled shakshuka or chakchouka) is a Maghrebi dish of eggs poached in a sauce of tomatoes, olive oil, peppers, onion and garlic, commonly spiced with cumin, paprika and cayenne pepper. According to Joan Nathan, shakshouka originated in Ottoman North Africa in the mid-16th century after tomatoes were introduced to the region by Hernán Cortés as part of the Columbian exchange.

Etymology
The word shakshouka is a Maghrebi Arabic term for "a mixture". The exact provenance of the word is often contested, but, like the names of many Maghrebi dishes and terms, is believed to come from the language of the Amazigh (or Berber) people indigenous to the region. In the western Maghreb, it is referred to as bīḍ u-maṭiša ( "egg and tomato").

History
The origin of the dish remains a matter of some controversy with competing claims of Algerian, Libyan, Moroccan, Tunisian, Turkish and Yemeni origins. Tomatoes and peppers are notably New World ingredients that only became common ingredients in later centuries after the Columbian exchange. 

North African Jewish immigrants in Israel brought the dish in the 1950s and 1960s, though it only became popularised on menus in the 1990s.

Variations

Many variations of the basic sauce are possible, varying in spice and sweetness. Some cooks add preserved lemon, salty sheep milk cheeses, olives, harissa or a spicy sausage such as chorizo or merguez. Shakshouka is made with eggs, which are commonly poached but can also be scrambled, like in the Turkish menemen.

Some variations of shakshouka can be made with lamb mince, toasted whole spices, yogurt and fresh herbs. Spices can include ground coriander, caraway, paprika, cumin and cayenne pepper. Tunisian cooks may add potatoes, broad beans, artichoke hearts or courgettes to the dish. The North African dish matbukha can be used as a base for shakshouka. 

A shakhsouka made with a kosher version of Spam (called loof) was added to IDF army rations in the 1950s. Because eggs are the main ingredient, it often appears on breakfast menus in English-speaking countries, but in the Arab world as well as Israel, it is also a popular evening meal, and like hummus and falafel, is a Levantine regional favorite. On the side, pickled vegetables and North African sausage called merguez might be served, or simply bread, with mint tea.

In Jewish culture, a large batch of tomato stew is made for the Sabbath dinner and the leftovers used the following morning to make a breakfast shakshouka with eggs.

See also

 List of Middle Eastern dishes
 Qalayet bandora
 Huevos rancheros
 Lecsó
 Taktouka

References

External links
 

Arab cuisine
Libyan cuisine
Tunisian cuisine
Algerian cuisine
Moroccan cuisine
Israeli cuisine
Egg dishes
National dishes
Mizrahi Jewish cuisine
Sephardi Jewish cuisine
Maghrebi cuisine
Ottoman cuisine
Spanish cuisine
Italian cuisine
Meze
Tomato dishes
Breakfast
Transatlantic cultural exchange
Shabbat food
Middle Eastern cuisine
Berber cuisine
Romani cuisine